"Jenny" Lang Ping (born 10 December 1960) is a Chinese former volleyball player and coach. She is the former head coach of China's women's national volleyball team and United States women's national volleyball team. As a player, Lang won the most valuable player award in women's volleyball at the 1984 Olympics.

In 2002, Lang became an inductee of the Volleyball Hall of Fame in Holyoke, Massachusetts. She coached the U.S. women's national team to a silver medal at the 2008 Beijing Olympics in her home country. Lang later coached the gold medal-winning Chinese women's national team at the 2016 Rio Olympics, becoming the first person in volleyball history, male or female, to have won Olympic gold both as a player and as a coach.

Lang is the main character in the 2020 biographical film Leap, in which she is played by actress Gong Li.

Personal life
Lang Ping was born in Tianjin. She was married to Chinese former handball player "Frank" Bai Fan from 1987 to 1995. In 1992, they had a daughter named Lydia Lang Bai, who played volleyball for Stanford University and played the young version of Lang Ping in the film Leap. Lang is currently married to Wang Yucheng, a professor at the China Academy of Social Science.

In 1987, Lang moved to Los Angeles with Bai to study and serve as an assistant volleyball coach at the University of New Mexico. When asked about the reasons for her move, she said she wanted "to taste a normal life." She maintains Chinese citizenship despite having lived in the U.S. for more than 15 years.

Career
Nicknamed the "Iron Hammer", Lang was a member of the Chinese National Team that won the Gold Medal over the United States at the 1984 Summer Olympics in Los Angeles, California. She was also a member of the team that won the World Championship crown in 1982 in Peru and won World Cup titles in 1981 and 1985. The Chinese women's volleyball team won multiple world championships during Lang's career. Lang was the star outside hitter on the team. She was named one of China's Top Ten Athletes of the year from 1981 to 1986.

Legacy in China
Owing to her central role in the success of the Chinese women's volleyball team in the 1980s, Lang was seen as a cultural icon and is one of the most respected people in modern Chinese sports history. Lang is remembered as one of the first world champions for China.

Coaching
Lang was an assistant coach at the University of New Mexico from 1987–89 and 1992–93.

In 1995, Lang became the head coach of the Chinese national team and eventually guided the squad to the silver medal at the 1996 Summer Olympics in Atlanta, Georgia and second place at the 1998 World Championships in Japan. Lang Ping resigned from the Chinese national team in 1998 due to health reasons. In the following year, she took a head coaching position in the Italian professional volleyball league and enjoyed great success there, winning various honours and the coach of the year award multiple times. She was selected 1996 FIVB Coach of the Year.

She became the coach of the US National Team in 2005. Lang guided the team to the 2008 Olympics, where the US team faced off with China in her home country. The US team defeated China 3–2. Then Chinese and US presidents, Hu Jintao and George W. Bush, attended the match. The match drew 250 million television viewers in China alone. The team went on to win the silver medal, losing to Brazil in the finals 3–1. Lang allowed her contract to run out later that year, citing that she wanted to coach a club so as to spend more time with her family.
She became the head coach of the China women's national volleyball team for the second time in 2013 and won the World Cup in Japan in 2015. In 2014, she was the only female head coach among the 24 teams in the FIVB World Championship.

On August 21, 2016, Lang Ping guided the Chinese national team to the gold medal at 2016 Rio Olympics. With this victory, Lang Ping became the first person in volleyball history, male or female, to win a gold medal at the Olympic Games as a player with the Chinese national team in Los Angeles 1984 and as the Chinese national team head coach in Rio 2016. On September 29, 2019, after China swept all eleven matches to defend the World Cup title, Lang Ping also became the first person to win the back-to-back World Cup champions both as a player(1981, 1985) and as a coach (2015, 2019).

Coaching career

Awards

Individuals
 1996 FIVB Coach of the Year

National team
 As a player 
 1981 World Cup -  Gold Medal
 1982 World Championship -  Gold Medal

 1984 Olympic Games Los Angeles -  Gold Medal
 1985 World Cup -  Gold Medal
 1990 World Championship -  Silver Medal
 As a coach
 1995 World Cup -  Bronze Medal
 1996 Olympic Games Atlanta -  Silver Medal
 1998 World Championship -  Silver Medal
 2007 World Cup -  Bronze Medal
 2008 Olympic Games Beijing -  Silver Medal
 2014 World Championship -  Silver Medal
 2015 World Cup -  Gold Medal
 2016 Olympic Games Rio -  Gold Medal
 2018 World Championship -  Bronze Medal
 2019 World Cup -  Gold Medal

References

External links
FIVB profile
Lang Ping's profile, Chinese Olympic Committee
Volleyball Hall of Fame

1960 births
Living people
American volleyball coaches
Chinese volleyball coaches
Chinese women's volleyball players
Olympic coaches
Olympic medalists in volleyball
Olympic gold medalists for China
Olympic volleyball players of China
Volleyball players at the 1984 Summer Olympics
Beijing Normal University alumni
University of New Mexico alumni
Manchu sportspeople
Asian Games medalists in volleyball
Volleyball players at the 1978 Asian Games
Volleyball players at the 1982 Asian Games
Medalists at the 1984 Summer Olympics
Volleyball players from Tianjin
2016 Olympic gold medalists for China
Chinese expatriate sportspeople in the United States
Expatriate volleyball players in Italy
Medalists at the 1978 Asian Games
Medalists at the 1982 Asian Games
Asian Games gold medalists for China
Asian Games silver medalists for China
Expatriate volleyball players in the United States
Expatriate volleyball players in Turkey
Chinese expatriates in Italy